William Owens (July 6, 1937 – January 22, 2022) was an American politician and businessman. He was the first Black state senator in the Massachusetts State Senate.

Biography
Owens was born in Demopolis, Alabama, on July 6, 1937. He went to the English High School of Boston. Owens also attended Boston University, Harvard University and University of Massachusetts Amherst. Owens was a private consultant and lived in Mattapan, Boston, Massachusetts. Owens served in the Massachusetts House of Representatives from 1973 to 1975 as a Democrat.

Following the creation of a majority-Black State Senate seat in South Boston, he ran for and won the seat, defeating Royal L. Bolling. He then served in the Massachusetts Senate from 1974 to 1982. In the early 80's, Owens changed his party registration to Republican, frustrated with the tightly controlled State Senate and what he viewed as the Democratic Party’s slow walk on issues of racial justice and economic equity. After losing re-election as a Republican to Royal L. Bolling in a rematch, he switched back to the Democratic party and, after defeating Bolling a final time, served in a final stint in the state senate from 1989 to 1993, losing the 1992 Democratic primary to his successor, Dianne Wilkerson.

As a legislator, Owens helped to create the Massachusetts state Office of Minority Business Assistance and the Summer Youth Jobs Program. He supported gun control. In the 1980s, he also "sponsored a bill that would have required state government to pay reparations to Massachusetts descendants of enslaved Black Americans." His sister, Shirley Owens-Hicks, served in the Massachusetts House of Representatives from 1987 to 2006.

Following a bout of COVID-19, Owens died in his sleep at a Brighton, Boston, nursing facility at age 84.

See also
 Massachusetts Senate's 2nd Suffolk district
 1973–1974 Massachusetts legislature
 1975–1976 Massachusetts legislature
 1977–1978 Massachusetts legislature
 1979–1980 Massachusetts legislature
 1981–1982 Massachusetts legislature
 1989–1990 Massachusetts legislature
 1991–1992 Massachusetts legislature

Notes

1937 births
2022 deaths
20th-century African-American people
21st-century African-American people
People from Demopolis, Alabama
Businesspeople from Boston
Politicians from Boston
English High School of Boston alumni
Boston University alumni
Harvard University alumni
University of Massachusetts Amherst alumni
Democratic Party members of the Massachusetts House of Representatives
Democratic Party Massachusetts state senators
African-American state legislators in Massachusetts
People from Mattapan
Deaths from the COVID-19 pandemic in Massachusetts